Ilie Cazac (born 1985, Tighina) is a former Moldovan tax inspector and political prisoner. He was arrested by representatives of the unrecognized Transnistria (the breakaway region of Moldova) in March 2010, being accused of high treason and espionage on behalf of Moldova. In February 2011, a court in Transnistria sentenced him to 14 years in prison. Among the institutions involved in his release in October 2011 were the UN High Commissioner for Human Rights, Navanethem Pillay, World Organization Against Torture, Organization for Security and Co-operation in Europe (OSCE), and the European Court of Human Rights.

Biography

Ilie Cazac was a former employee of the Tighina-based Tax Inspectorate. He and his family live in Tighina town. Ilie Cazac was arrested by representatives of the so-called Ministry of Security of the breakaway republic of Transnistria on March 20, 2010, being accused of treason and espionage for Moldova. His family was not informed about his arrest and fate for two weeks. On April 21, 2010, Promo-LEX lodged the case of Ilie Cazac before the European Court of Human Rights. On June 15, 2010, the participants at the European Partnership Fair for Civil Society Organizations in Moldova, in Chişinău, agreed on a Resolution concerning the situation of Ilie Cazac and Ernest Vardanean. According to the World Organization Against Torture, 

His parents, Stela Surchicean and Alexandru Viniţchi, began a hunger strike in front of the Russian Embassy in Chişinău, on June 12, 2011. They called on the government of the Russian Federation to intervene on behalf of their son. On June 22, 2011, it was reported that the Head of the OSCE Mission to Moldova, Philip Remler, met Cazac and confirmed that he was in good condition. Moldovan Prime Minister Vlad Filat met the mother of Cazac, Stela Surchicean, on June 22. The ambassador of the Russian Federation, Valeri Kuzmin, when contacted by Cazac's parents, recommended that they address the authorities of Transnistria, rather than the international community. On June 25, 2010, the 14th day of the hunger strike, the mother of Ilie Cazac was admitted to the gastroenterology department of the Republican Hospital in Chişinău. Her husband, Alexandru Viniţchi, continued to protest outside the Russian Embassy; he said that he will stay there until he enters a coma.

The parents decided to end hunger strike after his mother met with Ilie Cazac and talked for more than an hour and after the agreement from the separatist authorities to allow him to have his own defending lawyer. Stela Surchicean was accompanied by an OSCE representative who was not allowed to participate at the meeting. But the two parents cannot go back home in Bender because they feel in danger: "We were threatened in front of the OSCE representatives that if we go home we might end up in jail. Even if we have two houses in the Transnistrean region, we are now homeless."

In December 2010, the Deputy Prime Minister for Reintegration Victor Osipov has called on the foreign partners involved in the Transnistria conflict settlement process to enhance efforts so as to release Ilie Cazac and Ernest Vardanean. Official letters to this effect were sent to the diplomats representing Russia, Ukraine, the United States, the European Union and the OSCE, Kazakhstan (which chairs the OSCE in 2010). A similar message was sent to the special representative of the Council of Europe, as this organization plays an important role in the protection of human rights in Europe.

On February 9, 2011, as a result of a hidden trial, being deprived of elementary rights such as legal assistance and meetings with his relatives, Cazac was sentenced by the Supreme Court of the Transnistrian region to 14 years in prison. Ilie Cazac was subsequently transferred to the Tiraspol Penitentiary no.2, where he was detained in poor health. According to the World Organization Against Torture, 

On July 17, 2011, the World Organization Against Torture issued a statement, expressing its concern about the physical and mental state of Ilie Cazac. His pardon request was rejected in August 2011.

Ilie Cazac was released from prison in the evening of October 31, 2011. On November 2, 2011, Prime Minister Vlad Filat held a meeting with Ilie Cazac. On November 2, 2011, at the meeting with Cazacu, Navanethem Pillay said that the United Nations strongly backs the people detained in the Transnistrian region, noting that the United Nations had also advocated the release of Ilie Cazac. The UN High Commissioner for Human Rights noted that initially, the meeting was scheduled at the Tiraspol-based prison.

See also
 Human rights in Transnistria

References

External links 
 Moldova: Parents of Ilie Cazac demand a Russian intervention for their son’s release
 The parents of Ilie Cazac risk entering a coma
 Promo-LEX expresses concern at the increasingly dramatic situation of the two political prisoners - Ilie Cazac and Ernest Vardanean
 A Moldovan citizen, Ilie Cazac, whom the Tiraspol breakaway authorities sentenced to 14 years of imprisonment, was released today, due to joint efforts by Moldova's leadership, government and national competent institutions, with the support of the international partners involved in the process of settling the conflict with the Transnistrian region.
 Radio Free Europe, Transnistria authorities free Moldovan man jailed for 'spying'
 Prime Minister Vlad Filat today held a meeting with a tax inspector of the Tighina Fiscal Inspectorate, Ilie Cazac, who had been unlawfully arrested by the state security ministry of the breakaway Transnistrian republic
 Ilie Cazac is free! 
 Moldovan premier meets UN High Commissioner for Human Rights

1985 births
Living people
People from Bender, Moldova
Moldova State University alumni
Moldovan prisoners and detainees